Najeeb Yakubu (born 1 May 2000) is a professional footballer who plays as a right back for Finnish Veikkausliiga club Tampereen Ilves on loan from Ukrainian Premier League side FC Vorskla Poltava. Born in Ghana, he plays for the Niger national team.

Club career
On 20 April 2022, Yakubu joined CD Lugo in Spain under the special FIFA regulations related to the 2022 Russian invasion of Ukraine. However, he only participated in training and did not appear in any league games.

In August 2022 he once again suspended his contract with Vorskla under the same regulations, this time until 30 June 2023, and moved to Ilves in Finland.

International career
Born in Ghana, Yakubu is of Nigerien descent. 

He has expressed interest in playing for the Ukraine national team. 

He was called up to the Niger national team for a set of friendlies in March 2022. He debuted with Niger as a late substitute in a 3–0 friendly loss to Egypt on 23 September 2022.

Career statistics

Club

Notes

External links

References

2000 births
Living people
People with acquired Nigerien citizenship
Nigerien footballers
Association football fullbacks
Niger Tornadoes F.C. players
FC Vorskla Poltava players
CD Lugo players
FC Ilves players
Ukrainian Premier League players
Veikkausliiga players
Niger international footballers
Nigerien expatriate footballers
Nigerien expatriate sportspeople in Nigeria
Expatriate footballers in Nigeria
Nigerien expatriate sportspeople in Ukraine
Expatriate footballers in Ukraine
Nigerien expatriate sportspeople in Spain
Expatriate footballers in Spain
Expatriate footballers in Finland
Footballers from Accra
Ghanaian footballers
Ghana youth international footballers
Ghanaian expatriate footballers
Ghanaian expatriate sportspeople in Nigeria
Ghanaian expatriate sportspeople in Ukraine
Ghanaian expatriate sportspeople in Spain
Ghanaian expatriate sportspeople in Finland
Ghanaian people of Nigerien descent